Valentin Chetverkin (born 24 May 1996) is a Russian male acrobatic gymnast. He is a two-time World Championships bronze medalist (2012, 2014).

References

External links
 

1996 births
Living people
Russian acrobatic gymnasts
Male acrobatic gymnasts
Medalists at the Acrobatic Gymnastics World Championships
21st-century Russian people